Rabbit Over the Void is a 2006 Russian comedy film directed by Tigran Keosayan.

Plot 
Brezhnev went to Moldova and disappeared. Three days later, he appeared and flew to India. What did he do these three days?

Cast 
 Bohdan Stupka as Leonid Brezhnev
 Sergei Gazarov as Gipsy baron
 Vladimir Ilyin as Ivan Smirnov
 Yuri Stoyanov as Semion Grossu
 Vartan Darakchyan as Lautar (voiced by Artur Smolyaninov)
 Valeriya Lanskaya as Baron's daughter
 Yelena Safonova as Elizabeth II
 Mikhail Yefremov as Colonel Blyndu
 Alyona Khmelnitskaya as Rada
 Igor Zolotovitsky as Malay
 Vsevolod Gavrilov as Constructor

References

External links 
 

2006 films
Cultural depictions of Leonid Brezhnev
Cultural depictions of Elizabeth II
Russian comedy films
2000s Russian-language films
2006 comedy films